Peristera (Greek: Περιστέρα for "pigeons") is a small mountain village and a community, part of the municipal unit of Akrata, Achaea, Greece. It is located at the foot of the mountain Chelmos or Aroania, at an altitude of about 1,200 m. Peristera is connected by road north to Akrata. Mesorrougi is 1 km to the south, and Akrata is 16 km to the northeast. The community includes the villages Agridi and Chalkianika.

Historical population

See also

List of settlements in Achaea

References

External links
Greek Travel Pages

Aigialeia
Populated places in Achaea